Le Parti Des Choses ( Bardot et Godard or Paparazzi) is a short documentary directed by Jacques Rozier on the making of Jean-Luc Godard's film Le Mépris. It is included on the Criterion Collection DVD of Le Mépris.

Cast
Brigitte Bardot
Jean-Luc Godard
Fritz Lang
Jack Palance
Michel Piccoli

External links

French short documentary films
1964 films
Brigitte Bardot
1960s French films